Bhuli is a neighbourhood in Dhanbad in Dhanbad Sadar subdivision of Dhanbad district in Jharkhand, India.

Overview
It is famous for being the largest workers' colony in Asia. Town is managed by Bharat Coking Coal Limited(BCCL).  Majority of the population used to work in BCCL; but out of the 6011 BCCL quarters in Bhuli, nearly 4021 are illegally occupied by retired employees and this has become a very controversial topic.

Maintenance work of quarters and road is undertaken by Bhuli Town Administration, situated near A-Block Post Office.

History
Bhuli township was constructed in 1951 by The Coal Mines Welfare Organisation (CMWO) under the Ministry of Labour to provide housing facilities to miners. Bhuli is divided into 5 blocks. Initially it consisted only three blocks-  Block-'A', 'B' and 'C'. Each block has 600 quarters. Each quarter is single storeyed; having two bedrooms, one kitchen, a veranda, a washroom, a bathroom and a small yard. Every quarter has a tree planted in its yard.
The three blocks were transferred to BCCL in 1986. Two new blocks ('D' and 'E') were constructed in 1978 directly under the control of BCCL. But, the buildings in these blocks were made 3 storeyed, having 4 quarters at each storey, in contrast to Block A, B and C. Also, the new buildings lacked a yard and veranda, but provided a balcony for each quarter.
Today, there are a total of 6011 quarters in all over the Bhuli Township. The whole town is based on grid pattern.

Geography

Location

Note: The map alongside presents some of the notable locations in the area. All places marked in the map are linked in the larger full screen map.

Bhuli, earlier a census town, was combined with other urban units to form Dhanbad Municipal Corporation in 2006.

Bhuli is spread over parts of Ward Nos. 14, 15 and 16 of Dhanbad Municipal Corporation.

Overview
The region shown in the map is a part of the undulating uplands bustling with coalmines in the lowest rung of the Chota Nagpur Plateau. The entire area shown in the map is under Dhanbad Municipal Corporation, except Belgaria which is under Baliapur (community development block). The places in the DMC area are marked as neighbourhoods. The DMC area shown in the map is around the core area of Dhanbad city. Another major area of DMC is shown in the map of the southern portion of the district. A small stretch of DMC, extending up to Katras is shown in the map of the western portion. The region is fully urbanised. Jharia (community development block) has been merged into DMC. Three operational areas of BCCL operate fully within the region – Sijua Area, Kusunda Area and Bastacola Area.

Demographics
 India census, Bhuli had a population of 89,584. Males constitute 54% of the population and females 46%. Bhuli has an average literacy rate of 63%, higher than the national average of 59.5%; with male literacy of 71% and female literacy of 55%. 15% of the population is under 6 years of age.

Markets
There are three main markets in the township. These are D-Block Market (D-Block),  New Market (E-Block), and Shakti Market (D- Block Road).

Besides, four weekly Haats/Hatias (or markets especially dealing with buying and selling of vegetables and fruits) are set up in Bhuli-
1. Etwaari Hatia, Jharkhand More (on every Sunday, Etwaar means Sunday).
2. Somwaari Hatia, beside New Market and Durga Puja Hall, D-Block (on every Monday, Somwaar means Monday).
3. Budhni Hatia, near MPI, B-Block (on every Wednesday).
4. Shanichari Hatia, near Bhuli Railway Station (on every Saturday, Shanichar means Saturday).

Hospitals

Currently, there are two Regional Hospitals in Bhuli working under BCCL in C-Block and D-Block for free health check-up (for BCCL employees and dependents). But due to the small number of BCCL employees living in Bhuli (not more than a hundred or two), the hospitals are not properly maintained. So, Coal India Limited (a Maharatna Company), under which BCCL works, decided in mid 2020, to close the hospitals due to poor management and maintenance and people not preferring to go to these BCCL hospitals (Hospital staff and doctors will be transferred to other places). Instead, most people prefer visiting private clinics that are spread across Bhuli.

Banks
Bhuli has branches of Bank of India, State Bank of India and a branch of UCO Bank. Apart from that, ICICI Bank, AXIS Bank, Bank of India and State Bank of India have their ATMs in Bhuli.

Transport
Bhuli is well connected to Dhanbad city through road and railway. Most of the (local) passenger trains stop here.

Religious harmony

Bhuli witnesses a religious harmony among all the religions, especially Hindus and Muslims. Interestingly, the tradition of celebrating Durga Puja, a Hindu festival, was started by Abdul Majid Khan, a Muslim by religion. Similarly, Muharram, a Muslim festival, was started by a Hindu- Sudhir Mukherjee. The reason behind this act was to prevent communal riots during the partition of India. Residents claim that Bhuli has never witnessed any communal problems since 1949.

==References==

Neighbourhoods in Dhanbad
Mining communities in Jharkhand